Marvin Ogunjimi (born 12 October 1987) is a Belgian professional footballer of Nigerian descent who plays as a forward for Nielse in the Belgian Provincial Leagues. Until 2011, he played for the Belgium national team and has earned 7 caps.

Club career

Genk
Born in Mechelen, Ogunjimi made his professional debut with Racing Genk during the 2005–06 season. In 2007, he went on loan, playing for RKC Waalwijk. While with Waalwijk he appeared in 27 games and scored 10 goals. Upon returning to Genk, Ogunjimi became a prominent player for the Belgian side helping the club to the domestic title in the 2010–11 season. He also scored both of their goals as they won the 2009 Belgian Cup Final. In the Summer of 2011 Ogunjimi was supposed to be transferred last minute to RCD Mallorca but the papers arrived 7 minutes too late at FIFA so the transfer was refused.

Mallorca
On 14 November 2011, Mallorca announced Ogunjimi's move to their side. On 31 August 2012, he joined Standard Liège on a loan deal. In mid-February 2014, Ogunjimi signed for the New England Revolution on trial until the end of the month.

Strømsgodset
On 6 June 2014, Ogunjimi signed for Strømsgodset. The new club reportedly paid a small fee to Mallorca. He got his first match against Steaua in the second round of Champions League qualifications on 16 July 2014. On 2 August the same year, he scored in his home league debut match against Sogndal IL, which ended 1–1. He scored another three goals in the next three matches. Following this, he struggled under manager David Nielsen, and went 11 matches without scoring in the league. When new manager Bjørn Petter Ingebretsen took over, he put his faith in Ogunjimi, and the Belgian finally found the net on 21 June 2015. He scored four goals in three matches in the league, and one in the Europa League qualifications in June and July 2015, before he got injured in the second leg of the first qualifying round of the Europa League. On 14 July 2015, Strømsgodset announced that Ogunjimi had torn the anterior cruciate ligament in his left knee, and would miss the rest of the 2015 season.

Suwon FC
Ogunjimi signed for Suwon FC on 12 February 2016 and was loaned from July 2016 to Ratchaburi Mitr Phol. Upon return his contract was terminated by mutual consent as Suwon FC had suffered relegation.

Skënderbeu Korçë
On 1 February 2017, Ogunjimi signed for Skënderbeu Korçë until the end of December 2017. He made his first Albanian Superliga appearance one month later on 4 March in team's 1–1 home draw versus Teuta Durrës, playing the last 27 minutes as a substitute. His first and only start would come only on the final matchday against Partizani Tirana, playing for 60 minutes as Skënderbeu drew 2–2 at home, failing to retain the Albanian Superliga for the first time in five years. Following the end of 2016–17 which saw the team losing the championship for the first time in six years and losing the Albanian Cup final to Tirana, Ogunjimi was released after going goalless in 7 appearances, including 6 in league, which only 1 was as a starter.

Okzhetpes
On 17 June 2017, FC Okzhetpes announced the signing of Ogunjimi.

International career
On 8 October 2010, he made his international debut for Belgium against Kazakhstan in Astana, coming on at half-time and scoring twice in a 2–0 victory. Only four days later, in his second appearance against Austria, Ogunjimi started and scored a goal to tie the game at 3–3 in the 87th minute, as the match finished in a thrilling 4–4 tie.

Career statistics

Club

International

International goals
As of match played 11 October 2011. Belgium score listed first, score column indicates score after each Ogunjimi goal.

Honours
Racing Genk
Belgian Pro League: 2010–11
Belgian Cup: 2008–09
Belgian Supercup: 2011

References

External links

1987 births
Living people
Sportspeople from Mechelen
Footballers from Antwerp Province
Yoruba sportspeople
Belgian people of Yoruba descent
Belgian people of Nigerian descent
Belgian footballers
Association football forwards
K.R.C. Mechelen players
K.R.C. Genk players
RKC Waalwijk players
RCD Mallorca players
Standard Liège players
Beerschot A.C. players
Oud-Heverlee Leuven players
Strømsgodset Toppfotball players
Suwon FC players
Marvin Ogunjimi
KF Skënderbeu Korçë players
FC Okzhetpes players
MVV Maastricht players
FC Dynamo Brest players
Saigon FC players
Lierse Kempenzonen players
K. Patro Eisden Maasmechelen players
Belgian Pro League players
Belgian Third Division players
La Liga players
Eliteserien players
K League 1 players
Marvin Ogunjimi
Kategoria Superiore players
Belgian expatriate footballers
Kazakhstan Premier League players
Eerste Divisie players
Belgian expatriate sportspeople in Norway
Belgian expatriate sportspeople in Spain
Belgian expatriate sportspeople in the Netherlands
Belgian expatriate sportspeople in Albania
Belgian expatriate sportspeople in Kazakhstan
Expatriate footballers in Norway
Expatriate footballers in Spain
Expatriate footballers in South Korea
Expatriate footballers in Thailand
Expatriate footballers in Albania
Expatriate footballers in Kazakhstan
Expatriate footballers in Belarus
Expatriate footballers in the Netherlands
Expatriate footballers in Vietnam
Belgium international footballers
Black Belgian sportspeople